The Invincible is a hard science fiction novel by Polish writer Stanisław Lem, published in 1964.

The Invincible originally appeared as the title story in Lem's collection Niezwyciężony i inne opowiadania ("The Invincible and Other Stories"). A translation into German was published in 1967; an English translation  by Wendayne Ackerman, based on the German one, was published in 1973. A direct translation into English from Polish, by Bill Johnston, was published in 2006.

It was one of the first{{refn|group=nb|Earlier, a concept similar to nanotechnology, called "micromechanical devices", was described in Lem's 1959 novel Eden. See "Nanotechnology in fiction" for still earlier examples.  <ref> Doktryna nieingerencji, In: Marek Oramus, Bogowie Lema</ref>}} novels to explore the ideas of microrobots, smartdust, artificial swarm intelligence, and "necroevolution" (a term suggested by Lem for the evolution of non-living matter).

 Plot summary 

A heavily armed interstellar spacecraft called Invincible lands on the planet Regis III, which seems uninhabited and bleak, to investigate the loss of her sister ship, Condor. During the investigation, the crew finds evidence of a form of quasi-life, born through evolution of autonomous, self-replicating machines, apparently left behind by an alien civilization ship which landed on Regis III a very long time ago.

The protagonists come to speculate that a kind of evolution must have taken place under the selection pressures of "robot wars", with the only surviving form being swarms of minuscule, insect-like micromachines. Individually, or in small groups, they are quite harmless and capable of only very simple behavior. When threatened, they can assemble into huge clouds, travel at a high speed, and even climb to the top of the troposphere. These swarms display complex behavior arising from self-organization and can incapacitate any intelligent threat by a powerful surge of electromagnetic interference. Condors crew suffered a complete memory erasure as a consequence of attacks from these "clouds". The swarm, however, is reactive. It lacks intelligence and cannot formulate attack strategies proactively.

Invincible'''s crew mounts an escalating series of attacks on the perceived enemy, but eventually recognizes the futility of their efforts. The robotic "fauna", dubbed "necrosphere", has become part of the planet's ecology, and would require a disruption on a planetary scale to be destroyed.

In the face of defeat and imminent withdrawal of the Invincible, Rohan, the spaceship's first navigator, undertakes a trip into the "enemy area" in search of four crew members who went missing in action – an attempt which he and the Invincibles commander Horpach see as certainly futile, but necessary for moral reasons. Rohan wanders into canyons covered by metallic "shrubs" and "insects", and finds some of the missing crewmen dead. He gathers some evidence and returns to the ship unharmed, thanks partially to a device that cloaks his brain activity and partially to his calm and nonthreatening behavior. Rohan expresses his intention to petition for preservation of the planet's artificial ecosystem, which fascinates him.

Commentary
The novel turns into an analysis of the relationship between different life domains, and their place in the Universe. In particular, it is an imaginary experiment to demonstrate that evolution may not necessarily lead to dominance by intellectually superior life forms. The plot also involves a philosophical dilemma, juxtaposing the values of humanity and the efficiency of mechanical insects.

Theodore Sturgeon praised The Invincible as "sf in the grand tradition", saying "The Science is hard. The descriptions are vivid and powerful."

This idea of an "ultimate weapon system" was finalized by Lem in his fictitious review "Weapon Systems of the Twenty First Century or The Upside-down Evolution".

Adaptations

In the late 1960s, Michael Redstone acquired the rights to a film adaptation of the novel, but he failed to find producers. In his usual grumpy manner Lem commented that "it would probably have been awful, but I did earn a lot". 

In 2019, Rafał Mikołajczyk published the comic book Niezwyciężony [The Invincible], . Reviewers note the faithful rendering of Lem's original novel by Mikołajczyk in a different media.

In 2020, Polish video game developer Starward Industries announced a forthcoming adaptation of The Invincible. According to the developer, the adaptation will be designed specifically for the PC, PlayStation 5 and Xbox Series X/S consoles. The release is expected in 2023.

Notes

References

External links 
About the novel on the official Stanisław Lem website 
 About the novel on the official Stanisław Lem website (different content) 

Military science fiction novels
Novels by Stanisław Lem
1964 science fiction novels
Books with cover art by Richard M. Powers
Hard science fiction
Novels about artificial intelligence
Fiction about memory erasure and alteration
Hive minds in fiction
Self-replicating machines in fiction
Evolution in popular culture
Nanotechnology in fiction